Coronel Marcelino Maridueña is a town located in eastern Guayas, Ecuador. It is the seat of Coronel Marcelino Maridueña Canton.

At the 2001 census there were 10,697 people living within canton limits. The most important crop is sugar cane, but bananas and tropical fruits are also grown. The main rivers are the Chimbo River, the Chanchán River, and the Barranco Alto River.

Saint Charles Borromeo is the patron saint of Coronel Marcelino Maridueña.

Populated places in Guayas Province